Stary Majdan may refer to the following places:
Stary Majdan, Biłgoraj County in Lublin Voivodeship (east Poland)
Stary Majdan, Gmina Wojsławice in Lublin Voivodeship (east Poland)
Stary Majdan, Gmina Rejowiec in Lublin Voivodeship (east Poland)
Stary Majdan, Podlaskie Voivodeship (north-east Poland)
Stary Majdan, Włodawa County in Lublin Voivodeship (east Poland)